Norton St Philip is a village and civil parish in the Mendip district of Somerset, England. It is situated on the A366 between Trowbridge and Radstock, and on the B3110 between Bath and Frome.

New development greatly increased the size of the village in the later 20th century, but there has been a significant reduction in services, with the police station, post office and shops all having closed.  This was partly reversed by the opening of a new supermarket, incorporating a post office, in 2016.

History
The earliest signs of habitation can be found a mile to the east of the current village, where the Roman road from Bath to Poole passed. A priory was founded near the village in 1232 and had links with the village until its dissolution under the orders of Henry VIII on 31 March 1540. Norton developed a thriving wool trade and became the site of a regional market, signs of which can be seen in local surnames such as Weaver. The parish of Norton St Philip was part of the Wellow Hundred.

Norton St Philip was the site of the Battle of Norton St Philip during the Monmouth Rebellion in 1685, and the east–west street on the village's northern edge, officially recorded as Chevers Lane, is referred to locally as Bloody Lane, reportedly as the battle caused so much bloodshed it flowed down this hill. In the aftermath of the failed rebellion Judge Jefferies conducted 12 executions on the village common, known as Churchmead or The Mead, as part of the Bloody Assizes. The route he took to The Mead is known as Jefferies Gate.

The George Inn, one of a number of establishments that claim to be Britain's oldest tavern, is located in the centre of the village. It was built in the 14th or 15th century, as a wool store for the priory at Hinton Charterhouse and to accommodate travellers and merchants coming to the annual wool fairs that were held in the village from the late 13th century until 1902. In the 15th century the timber-framed upper floors were added. The inn became part of the stage coach route between London and the South West; on 12 June 1668 the noted diarist Samuel Pepys, with his wife and servants, passed through Norton St Philip on their way to Bath from Salisbury. The inn was later used as the headquarters of Monmouth's army after his retreat from Bath, and was further used as a court by Judge Jefferies.

Faccenda operated a poultry processing plant until the late 1990s, when the property was burnt down. The site has subsequently been redeveloped for housing. A development has been approved for 51 houses phased over the years 2012–2014. The new housing is to be constructed in materials and a style sympathetic to the local vernacular.

Governance

The parish council has responsibility for local issues, including setting an annual precept (local rate) to cover the council's operating costs and producing annual accounts for public scrutiny. The parish council evaluates local planning applications and works with the local police, district council officers, and neighbourhood watch groups on matters of crime, security, and traffic. The parish council's role also includes initiating projects for the maintenance and repair of parish facilities, as well as consulting with the district council on the maintenance, repair, and improvement of highways, drainage, footpaths, public transport, and street cleaning. Conservation matters (including trees and listed buildings) and environmental issues are also the responsibility of the council.

The village falls within the Non-metropolitan district of Mendip, which was formed on 1 April 1974 under the Local Government Act 1972, having previously been part of Frome Rural District, which is responsible for local planning and building control, local roads, council housing, environmental health, markets and fairs, refuse collection and recycling, cemeteries and crematoria, leisure services, parks, and tourism.

Somerset County Council is responsible for running the largest and most expensive local services such as education, social services, libraries, main roads, public transport, policing and  fire services, trading standards, waste disposal and strategic planning.

It is also part of the Somerton and Frome county constituency represented in the House of Commons of the Parliament of the United Kingdom. It elects one Member of Parliament (MP) by the first past the post system of election.

Transport

Today the village is largely a dormitory settlement for the surrounding towns, and the High Street is a congested, though fast by local standards, commuting route into Bath. Recently, measures have been taken to slow down the rat run traffic through the village by the installation of bollards designed to inhibit through-traffic mounting the pedestrian footpath. Over recent years, the through-traffic utilising the village as a rat run had increased drastically, with the side effect being the increase in traffic incidents involving damage to the cars of the village's inhabitants. There is also an hourly bus service operated by First West of England.

Religious sites

The church of St Philip and St James dates from the 14th century with restoration in 1847 by Sir George Gilbert Scott. It has been designated by English Heritage as a Grade II* listed building.

Gallery of images

References

External links

 The Somerset Urban Archaeological Survey: Norton St Philip, by Clare Gathercole
 The Norton St Philip Homepage

Villages in Mendip District
Civil parishes in Somerset